Teodora Ungureanu (born 13 November 1960) is a Romanian former gymnast who competed at the 1976 Summer Olympics. She is a three-time Olympic medalist (two silver and one bronze) and a world championships silver medalist. After retiring from gymnastics she has enjoyed a successful career as a gymnastics coach.

Gymnastics career
Ungureanu began gymnastics at the age of nine. She trained in Bucharest until she was 12, when she joined the gymnastics school run by Béla Károlyi and his wife, Márta. 

At her first Romanian National Championships, in 1971, she placed first in the all-around in the children's division. While Ungureanu was a skilled athlete, medalling at various World Cup and international events, she was frequently overshadowed by her more celebrated teammate and friend, Nadia Comăneci (who was born the day before Ungureanu's first birthday). She placed second to Comăneci at various events, including the Romanian Nationals. At the 1976 Summer Olympics, Ungureanu barely missed an all-around bronze, finishing fourth. She did win two individual medals in the event finals, a bronze on the balance beam and a silver on the uneven bars, and shared in the team's silver medal. Ungureanu's final meet was the 1979 World University Games, where she finished first in the all-around.

Post retirement
Following her retirement, she married Romanian Olympic gymnast Sorin Cepoi and began working with the Troup Cornea travelling circus. She and her husband eventually moved to France, where they coached for eight years before going to the United States in 1993. In 2001, she was inducted into the International Gymnastics Hall of Fame. Currently, Ungureanu and her husband own Dynamic Gymnastics club in Westchester, New York. Ungureanu coached four-year national team member and 2011 world champion Sabrina Vega until 2012 at Dynamic Gymnastics. Ungureanu is also rated as an International Gymnastics Official and serves as a judge at various competitions.

Competitive history

References

External links

Bio at romanian-gymnastics.com
List of competitive results at Gymn Forum
Whatever Happened to Teodora Ungureanu?
Profile at GymnasticaBio.com
Dynamic Gymnastics Homepage

1960 births
Living people
Romanian female artistic gymnasts
Romanian emigrants to the United States
American gymnastics coaches
American sportswomen
Olympic gymnasts of Romania
Olympic silver medalists for Romania
Olympic bronze medalists for Romania
Olympic medalists in gymnastics
Gymnasts at the 1976 Summer Olympics
Medalists at the 1976 Summer Olympics
Medalists at the World Artistic Gymnastics Championships
Sportspeople from Reșița
21st-century American women